Carolyn Yarnell (born 1961) is an American composer and visual artist. A recipient of the Rome Prize, Charles Ives Prize, and a Guggenheim Fellowship, she is particularly noted for works which combine visual and musical depictions of landscape and light, many of which were inspired by the landscapes of her native California.

Background
Yarnell grew up in the Sierra Nevada region of California. She studied composition at the San Francisco Conservatory of Music where she received a Bachelor of Music in 1986 and at Yale University where she received her master's degree in 1989. Two years later the final two movements of her five-movement Symphony No. 1, Enemy Moon and Exit, commissioned by the Tanglewood Music Center, had their world premiere at Tanglewood's Festival of Contemporary Music. Yarnell is a long-time member of the Common Sense Composers Collective who via collaborations with groups such as the New Millennium and American Baroque ensembles have premiered many contemporary works by their members and other composers. The collective has produced several CDs including TIC (2007) and The Shock of the Old (2002). The latter featured contemporary compositions played on baroque period instruments.

Selected works
The Same Sky, for piano, electronics and video projection (2000)
 Symphony No. 1.
Mean Harp, for solo piano
Living Mountains, tone poem for orchestra
Lapis Lazuli, chamber music
Yosemite and the Range of Light, multi-movement orchestral work
Film score for La Souriante Madame Beudet (1927 silent film by Germaine Dulac)

Recordings
The Shock of the Old – Common Sense Composers Collective and the American Baroque Ensemble, works by Marc Mellits, Belinda Reynolds, Ed Harsh, Randall Woolf, Dan Becker, Carolyn Yarnell, John Halle and Melissa Hui (2002). Label: Santa Fe New Music
Sonic Vision – works by Carolyn Yarnell  (2003). Label: Tzadik
Kathy Supové: Infusion – contemporary piano works by Marti Epstein, Elaine Kaplinsky, Randall Woolf, and Carolyn Yarnell (2004). Label: Koch International Classics
TIC – Common Sense Composers Collective and the New Millenium Ensemble, works by Marc Mellits, Belinda Reynolds, Ed Harsh, Randall Woolf, Dan Becker, Carolyn Yarnell and John Halle (2007). Label: Albany Records

References

Sources
Burns, Kristine Helen (2002). Women and music in America since 1900: An encyclopedia, Volume 1. Greenwood Press. 
Dalton, Joseph (2007a). "Perlman remains a giant among violinists". Albany Times Union, June 2, 2007
Dalton, Joseph (2007b). "Composer in tune to her life as vagabond". Albany Times Union, November 14, 2007 
Dyer, Richard (1991). "Tanglewood festival ends on a high note ". The Boston Globe, August 9, 1991 
Hastie, Amelie and Stamp, Shelley (2006). "Women and the Silent Screen: Cultural and Historical Practices", Film History: An International Journal, Vol. 18, No. 2, 2006, pp. 107–109 
Kosman, Joshua (2002). "New music, old instruments". San Francisco Chronicle, June 30, 2002
WNYC (August 11, 2009). Evening Music: Lapis Lazuli by Carolyn Yarnell
Holland, Bernard (1993). "Classical Music in Review: American Composers Orchestra Carnegie Hall". The New York Times, June 22, 1993
Holland, Bernard (1994) "Detonations of Sound, Here, There and Everywhere – Kathleen Supove, Pianist Roulette". The New York Times, December 21, 1994

External links
Official website
Common Sense Composers' Collective
Carolyn Yarnell on WorldCat

American women classical composers
American classical composers
20th-century classical composers
21st-century classical composers
1961 births
Living people
Pupils of Jacob Druckman
21st-century American composers
20th-century American women musicians
20th-century American composers
21st-century American women musicians
20th-century women composers
21st-century women composers